Rueckbeilia is a genus of butterflies in the family Lycaenidae, first described in 2013. 

It contains two species:

 Rueckbeilia fergana (Staudinger, 1881)
 Rueckbeilia rosei (Eckweiler, 1989)

References

External links

Polyommatini
Lycaenidae genera